Kassina is a genus of hyperoliid frogs, commonly referred to as running frogs or kassinas. They are found throughout sub-Saharan Africa. They are characterized by preferring a distinctive "walking" with the back legs instead of the more traditional frog-hopping.

Species
The following species are recognized in the genus Kassina:

In captivity 
K. maculata is frequently exported from Tanzania for the exotic pet trade.  They require more horizontal space than vertical, being a terrestrial species. Their captive environment should include a substrate that accommodates burrowing, and provides high humidity.  K. maculata will readily eat crickets and small mealworms, although insects should be dusted with a vitamin supplement.

Other species of running frogs are occasionally imported, with the K. senegalensis being the next most common species in captivity.

Research
It is the source of "kassinin", a frequently studied tachykinin peptide.

References

External links
 
 

 
Amphibians of Sub-Saharan Africa
Hyperoliidae
Amphibian genera
Taxa named by Charles Frédéric Girard